Oued El Aneb is a town in north-eastern Algeria. The town of Oued El Aneb (وادي العنب) (ⵡⴻⴷ ⵍⵄⴻⵏⴱ) is a commune of Algeria, located in the wilaya of d'Annaba at 36° 53′ 00″n, 7° 29′ 00″ e on the Mediterranean Sea between the towns of  Chetaïbi, and Annaba. The population of the town is 21088.  Lake Fetzara is to the south.

References

Communes of Annaba Province